Arthur John Watson (22 March 1902 – 2 July 1983) was an Australian rules footballer who played for the Hawthorn Football Club in the Victorian Football League (VFL).

Notes

External links 

1902 births
1983 deaths
VFL/AFL players born outside Australia
Australian rules footballers from Victoria (Australia)
Hawthorn Football Club players